George (8 August 1832 – 15 October 1904) was king of Saxony and member of the House of Wettin.

Early life
George was born in the Saxon capital Dresden. He was the second son of King John of Saxony (1801–1873) and his wife, Princess Amalie Auguste of Bavaria (1801–1877), daughter of King Maximilian I Joseph of Bavaria (1756–1825).

Marriage
On 11 May 1859 at Belém Palace, Lisbon, George married the younger sister of King Pedro V of Portugal: Infanta Maria Anna of Portugal, eldest surviving daughter of Queen Maria II of Portugal and her consort, Prince Ferdinand of Saxe-Coburg and Gotha-Koháry. Maria Anna died young and George stayed unmarried for the rest of his long life.

Issue

Military career
George served under his brother Albert's command during the Austro-Prussian War of 1866 and in the Franco-German War. In the re-organisation of the army which accompanied the march towards Paris, his brother the Crown Prince gained a separate command over the 4th army (Army of the Meuse) consisting of the Saxon XII corps, the Prussian Guard corps, and the IV (Prussian Saxony) corps and George succeeded him in command of the XII corps.

King of Saxony

Prince George was a Generalfeldmarschall before his ascension. It gradually became clear that George's elder brother, Albert I (1828–1902), and his wife, Queen Carola (1833–1907), would not have any children, thereby making George the heir presumptive to the throne. He succeeded Albert I as King of Saxony on 19 June 1902, albeit for just a brief two-year reign. On 15 October 1904 he died in Pillnitz and was succeeded by his eldest son, Frederick Augustus III (1865–1932), who was deposed in 1918.

King George was a controversial figure. He divorced by royal decree his eldest son from his daughter-in-law, Crown Princess Luise. Luise's flight from Dresden was due to her father-in-law's threatening to have her interned in a mental asylum at the Sonnenstein Castle for life.

Honours and awards

Ancestry

See also
Rulers of Saxony

References

External links

 George, King of Saxony, ThePeerage.com

1832 births
1904 deaths
Nobility from Dresden
Field marshals of Saxony
Field marshals of the German Empire
German military personnel of the Franco-Prussian War
People of the Austro-Prussian War
House of Wettin
Kings of Saxony
Burials at Dresden Cathedral
Saxon princes
German Roman Catholics
Members of the First Chamber of the Diet of the Kingdom of Saxony
Albertine branch
Military personnel from Dresden
Recipients of the Pour le Mérite (military class)
Knights of the Golden Fleece of Austria
Grand Crosses of the Order of Saint Stephen of Hungary
2
2